Bowling Green Studies in Applied Philosophy is a series of conference proceedings produced by the philosophy department at Bowling Green State University on the subject of applied philosophy. Each volume consists of selected papers presented at the annual conference on applied philosophy held at Bowling Green from 1979 to 1986. These conferences were sponsored by the university's Applied Philosophy Program with support from the National Endowment for the Humanities.  The eight volumes in this series explore the philosophical implications of social problems whose solutions require rational planning and decision making. The series was produced in cooperation with the Philosophy Documentation Center. Contributors to the series include Frithjof Bergmann, Myles Brand, David Hoekema, Jaegwon Kim, Joseph Margolis, Jan Narveson, Douglas Rasmussen, Nicholas Rescher, Robert C. Solomon, James Sterba, and Iris Young.

Volumes in the series
 Values and Moral Standing - Volume 8, 1986
 The Restraint of Liberty - Volume 7, 1985
 Social Policy and Conflict Resolution - Volume 6, 1984
 The Applied Turn in Contemporary Philosophy - Volume 5, 1983
 Social Justice - Volume 4, 1982
 Reason and Decision - Volume 3, 1981
 Actions and Responsibility - Volume 2, 1980
 Understanding Human Emotions - Volume 1, 1979

External links 
 
 Philosophy Documentation Center
 Bowling Green State University, Philosophy Department

Philosophical literature
Publications established in 1979
Philosophy Documentation Center academic journals
Bowling Green State University